The 1963–64 FIBA European Champions Cup was the seventh season of the European top-tier level professional basketball club competition FIBA European Champions Cup (now called EuroLeague). It was won by Real Madrid, marking the first of the club's 10 EuroLeague championships in its history.

Real defeated Spartak ZJŠ Brno in the two-legged EuroLeague Final, after losing the first game in Brno, 110–99, and winning the second game at Madrid, 84–64.

Competition system
23 teams. European national domestic league champions, plus the then current FIBA European Champions Cup title holders only, playing in a tournament system. The Finals were a two-game home-and-away aggregate.

First round

|}

Second round

|}

*Since the aggregate score after the two legs was tied, a tie-break was played in București on 19 January 1964: Steaua București – Galatasaray 57–56.

**Benfica withdrew before the first leg and Legia Warsaw received a forfeit (2-0) in both games.

***PUC could not travel to Belgrade to play the first leg after all fights to the Yugoslavian capital were cancelled due to adverse weather. Later, FIBA decided that this tie should be played as a single game in Paris (16 January 1964).

Automatically qualified to the quarterfinals
 CSKA Moscow (title holder) withdrew before the competition. The "official" explanation given by the Soviet Basketball Federation was to prepare the Olympic Games.

Quarterfinals

|}

Automatically qualified to the semifinals
 OKK Beograd

Semifinals

|}

Finals

|}

First leg Brno Ice rink, Brno;Attendance 12,000 or 14,000 (29 April 1964)

Second leg Frontón Vista Alegre, Madrid;Attendance 2,500 (10 May 1964)

Awards

FIBA European Champions Cup Finals Top Scorer
 Emiliano Rodríguez ( Real Madrid)

References

External links
 1963–64 FIBA European Champions Cup
1963–64 FIBA European Champions Cup 
1963–64 FIBA European Champions Cup
Champions Cup 1963–64 Line-ups and Stats

FIBA
1963-64